Unión Nacional de Trabajadores (Spanish for National Union of Workers, UNT) may refer to:
 Unión Nacional de Trabajadores de Chile
 Unión Nacional de Trabajadores de España
 Unión Nacional de Trabajadores de México
 Unión Nacional de Trabajadores de Venezuela